The Patiala peg is a peg of whisky in which the amount is decided based on the height between the top of the index and base of the little fingers when held parallel to one another, against the side of the standard 26.5 oz (750ml) glass bottle. This has been confused with Chinese peg at times, in which water is poured followed by liquor thus forming two distinct layers. Even major liquor companies have started selling their products in the single drink packaging of 90 ml & 120 ml bottles in India. The name originates from the city of Patiala, which was once a state known globally for the extravagant ways of its royalty and extraordinary height of its Sikh soldiers.

There are multiple theories how the measure got its name, all of which revolve around Maharaja Sir Bhupinder Singh who ruled the princely state of Patiala from 1900 until his death in 1938. An enigmatic personality who came to rule when he was merely nine years old, Maharaja Bhupinder was a man with fine tastes. It is said that he had 365 women (queens as well as concubines) in his palace. He also owned more than 10 Rolls-Royce cars and the famous Patiala Necklace which had 2930 diamonds including the world's seventh largest called De Beers. The founder of State Bank of Patiala believed in  living life to the fullest.

It is believed that the Maharaja had a polo team that consisted of legendary Sikh warriors like himself. He invited an Irish team called Viceroy's Pride for a friendly tournament of 'tent pegging' (a competition where players on horseback have to pierce and pull out small objects embedded in the ground, usually wooden plates of the dimensions of the sole of a size 12 shoe, with their lances). The Irish team arrived, all as imposing as their Sikh counterparts. The Irish team members were known to be heavy drinkers. Wherever this competition was held, there used to be a party night before and Irish were known to drink to full capacity and perform at their best the next day. Same as routine, a night before the competition, a party was held in Patiala, huge amounts of whisky was served to both teams and both teams drank to their capacity. Next day, the Irish team woke up with the effect of the whisky still on them and could not display their best and thus they lost the competition. From that day onwards, the Patiala team became famous for their drinking capacity and Patiala Peg for its strong effect  of alcohol. Generally, the Patiala Peg is referred to for its particular volume and strong residual effect.

A related and popular measure of liquor popular in Punjab is the Greg Peg . It is a volume roughly equivalent to 120ml, though the rough and ready measure is the amount of liquor needed to fill a small tumbler. The name originates from the city of Patiala in Indian state of Punjab, and is about twice as large as a normal shot glass. The Greg Peg was first made by Greg Kennedy (generally attributed to being an American citizen) to outdo native Punjabis while drinking Scotch Whisky. According to legend, a Punjabi drinker, in the legendary Mountview Hotel in Chandigarh, told Greg that the world's largest peg was a Patiala Peg. Not to be outdone, Greg announced the largest peg in the world was actually a Greg Peg and it was twice as large as a large Peg. The name stuck with the trendy crowd and is now used in the bars and nightclubs in Punjab by young men hoping to show their virility and masculinity

See also
Peg (unit)

References

Units of volume
Patiala
Punjabi culture
Alcohol in India
Drinking culture